Antigone is the third full-length album of the German metal band Heaven Shall Burn. It was released on 26 April 2004 through Century Media Records.

Background 
The title was inspired by the female character of the play Antigone by Sophocles. The play is about a passionate young woman, that does what she knows is right, even though it is against the law. She makes sure that all of the town's people know what she did and she is punished by the king.

The intro and the two outros were composed and recorded by Icelandic composer Ólafur Arnalds. A video was made for "The Weapon They Fear", a song that commemorates Víctor Jara. "Tree of Freedom" deals with the life of Nelson Mandela. "Voice of the Voiceless" refers to the band's strong pro-vegan stance. "Bleeding to Death" deals with the economic and social problems in the former East Germany, from where the band originates.

The song "The Dream is Dead" was featured in an episode of Viva la Bam, entitled "Viva La Europe Pt. 2".

Reception 

In 2005, Antigone was ranked number 474 in Rock Hard magazine's book The 500 Greatest Rock & Metal Albums of All Time.

Track listing 

 Track 8's title is Icelandic and means "Rising Hope", but it contains a spelling mistake, as rísa is written with an í, not an ì. This error is present on all releases of the album.
 Track 12' title is Icelandic and means "Dying Hope".

Credits 
Production and performance credits are adapted from the album liner notes.

Heaven Shall Burn
 Marcus Bischoff – vocals
 Maik Weichert – guitars
 Patrick Schleitzer – guitars
 Eric Bischoff – bass
 Matthias Voigt – drums

Additional musicians
 Alexander Dietz – clean vocals on "To Harvest the Storm", "The Dream Is Dead"
 Ólafur Arnalds – piano, samples, keyboard on "Echoes", "Rìsandi Von", "Deyjandi Von"
 Greta Salome Stefansdottir – violin on "Echoes", "Rìsandi Von", "Deyjandi Von"
 Thordur Gudmundur Herrmannson – cello on "Echoes", "Rìsandi Von", "Deyjandi Von"

Production
 Patrick W. Engel – production
 Ralf Müller – engineering
 Kai Tenneberg – assisting engineering
 Tue Madsen – mixing, mastering
 Ólafur Arnalds – production, engineering on "Echoes", "Rìsandi Von", "Deyjandi Von"

Artwork and design
 Spiros Antoniou (Set<'H>dEsign) – artwork
 Stefan Luedicke – layout
 Stefan Wibbeke – layout
 Simon Büttner – band photo

Release history

References

External links 

2004 albums
Albums with cover art by Spiros Antoniou
Century Media Records albums
Heaven Shall Burn albums